Blandine Maisonnier (born 3 January 1986 at Lille) is a French athlete, who specializes in the heptathlon.  In 2012, she took second place in the heptathlon at the Multistars meeting.

International competitions
 2007 European Championship Under 23s at Debrecen:
 10th   : 5 894 points

National titles
French Athletics Championships
Heptathlon: 2008, 2011   
French Indoor Athletics Championships
Pentathlon: 2008, 2011, 2012

Personal bests  
Outdoors

Indoors

References
 Biography on the site of the FFA
 
  Profile of NBC Olympics

1986 births
Living people
Sportspeople from Lille
French female athletes
French heptathletes
French pentathletes